The Abrial A-260 is a tailless modification of the Caudron C.260 developed by French glider designer Georges Abrial.

Specifications (Abrial A-260)

Notes

References

A-260
Flying wings
Tailless aircraft